Jacques Lemaigre Dubreuil (1894–1955)  was a French businessman and activist, born in Solignac on October 30, 1894 and murdered in Casablanca on June 11, 1955 presumably by members of La Main Rouge (Red Hand) for being allegedly sympathetic to the Moroccan nationalist cause.

He married Simone Lesieur, daughter of Georges Lesieur – founder of the brand of edible oils of the same name (Huiles Lesieur). Having joined its board of directors in 1926, he directed and developed the company until his death.  He owned the Maroc-Presse newspaper and had interests in the Printemps department store chain.

An active militant of the anticomunism movement, he was one of the funders of La Cagoule in the late 1930s.

During the Second World War, he was very active in the underground. He was one of those who favoured the Allied landings in North Africa, on 8 November 1942, Operation Torch. He was a link between Robert Murphy and Henri Giraud; when the latter arrived in Algeria, he was accommodated in Lemaigre Dubreuil's house

Later, Lemaigre Dubreuil was very active in supporting Moroccan claims for autonomy, for which he drew fierce hatred from movements supporting the retention of Morocco as a French protectorate.  These movements, described at the time as terrorist-cons had many accomplices in European circles, including the French administration.  It is suspected the French secret service were closely related to some of them, such as La Main Rouge (Red Hand).

Lemaigre Dubreuil was assassinated in Casablanca on the evening of June 11, 1955, in the square that later bore his name, at the foot of the "Liberté"  building where he lived.  His funeral took place on June 14 in the Cathedral of the Sacred Heart of Casablanca.

References

1894 births
1955 deaths
Assassinated French people
People from Haute-Vienne
People murdered in Morocco
Deaths by firearm in Morocco
French newspaper publishers (people)
French expatriates in Morocco